Thomas Raymond Evans (born 31 December 1976) is a former professional footballer who played as a goalkeeper. Born in England, he played for the Northern Ireland B team.

Club career

Early career
Born in Doncaster, South Yorkshire, Evans started his career with the Sheffield United youth system as a trainee before signing a professional contract on 3 July 1995. He made no appearances for the side before joining Crystal Palace on a free transfer on 14 June 1996, and was loaned out to Isthmian League side Harrow Borough in August. Evans later made a loan move to Premier League side Coventry City in March 1997, but failed to make any appearances.

Scunthorpe United
Palace released him after his first season at the club and on 22 August 1997 he signed for Scunthorpe United. Evans played for Scunthorpe in their 1–0 victory over Leyton Orient in the 1999 Third Division play-off final at Wembley Stadium. He had surgery on a hand injury in May 2005, having suffered a problem with one of his knuckles on his index finger that had troubled him in previous seasons. This operation led to him missing the first two months of the season, but returned to the line-up in early December. He kept his place in the team for three months and after another spell on the sidelines he played in Scunthorpe's last six matches of the season.

York City
He was released by Scunthorpe in May 2006 and joined Conference National club York City on 31 July after making a good impression on manager Billy McEwan during several weeks on trial. He said that he believed promotion could be achieved for York with 20 clean sheets. He was sent off in the 16th minute of an away match against Crawley Town on 9 September 2006 after fouling Dannie Bulman outside the penalty area, which York lost 3–0 with second choice goalkeeper Arran Reid brought on to replace him. He was offered a new contract by York at the end of 2006–07.

At the beginning of York's 2007–08 season, Evans came under-fire for poor performances by his manager, Billy McEwan and was later replaced by on-loan Bristol City goalkeeper Stephen Henderson. Evans kept his place in the side after Henderson's recall back to Bristol City but was released at the end of the season.

Later career
He signed for Alfreton Town in the Conference North in July 2008. Evans found himself dropped from the Alfreton team at the beginning of December 2008 and in March 2009 Evans joined Gainsborough Trinity on a one-month loan, debuting in 1–1 away draw with Redditch United on 21 March 2009. At Gainsborough, he made four appearances. He finished 2008–09 with 24 appearances with Alfreton and he was released by the club, after which he joined Northern Premier League Premier Division team Boston United on 23 July 2009. He was released by Boston on 9 May 2010 after helping them win promotion to the Conference North after beating Bradford Park Avenue 2–1 in the 2010 Northern Premier League Premier Division play-off final. He later returned to former club Scunthorpe to coach the youth team's goalkeepers.

International career
Evans played Northern Ireland at youth level and won his only cap for the Northern Ireland B team in a 2–1 defeat to Scotland on 20 May 2003.

Personal life
After retiring from professional football, Evans earned qualifications as a financial adviser and worked for Lloyds Bank before joining Paul Kerr Associates, the organisation of former player Paul Kerr. He has a son called Bobby and a daughter called Molly

Career statistics

Honours
Scunthorpe United
Third Division play-offs: 1998–99

Boston United
Northern Premier League Premier Division play-offs: 2009–10

References

External links

1976 births
Living people
Footballers from Doncaster
English footballers
Association footballers from Northern Ireland
Northern Ireland youth international footballers
Northern Ireland B international footballers
Association football goalkeepers
Sheffield United F.C. players
Crystal Palace F.C. players
Harrow Borough F.C. players
Coventry City F.C. players
Scunthorpe United F.C. players
York City F.C. players
Alfreton Town F.C. players
Gainsborough Trinity F.C. players
Boston United F.C. players
English Football League players
National League (English football) players
Northern Premier League players